Fouad may refer to:

People with the single name
Fuad I of Egypt (1868-1936), also spelled Fouad, sultan and later king of Egypt
Fuad II of Egypt (born 1952), deposed infant king of Egypt

Fictional characters
Fouad (Family Guy), character in American animated comedy series

People with the surname
Amina Fouad (born 1980), Egyptian volleyball player
Ceet Fouad (born 1971), Algerian muralist
Hala Fouad (1958-1992), Egyptian film and TV actress
Mohamed Fouad (born 1961), Egyptian singer and actor
Muharram Fouad (1934-2002), Egyptian singer and film star
Nagwa Fouad (born 1943), Egyptian-Palestinian belly-dancer
Yasmine Fouad, Egyptian politician
Tamino-Amir Moharam Fouad (born 1996), Belgian-Egyptian singer and model, grandson of Egyptian singer Muharram Fouad

People with the given name
Fouad (given name), includes list of holders of the name Fouad or Fuad

Other uses

See also
 Includes people with the given name